The Christopher Formation is a geologic formation in Nunavut. It preserves fossils dating back to the Cretaceous period.

See also 
 List of fossiliferous stratigraphic units in Nunavut

References 

Geologic formations of Canada
Cretaceous Nunavut
Aptian Stage
Paleontology in Nunavut